Queen Margot or La Reine Margot may refer to:

 Margaret of Valois (1553–1615), queen consort of Navarre and later also of France
 La Reine Margot (novel), 1845 French novel by Alexandre Dumas about Margaret of Valois
 La Reine Margot (1954 film), French film based on Alexandre Dumas' novel
 La Reine Margot (1994 film), French film also based on Alexandre Dumas' novel
 Queen Margot (comics), Franco-Belgian graphic novel series about Margaret of Valois